Darlinghurst Theatre is an independent theatre company based at the Eternity Playhouse in Darlinghurst, New South Wales. 

Glenn Terry established the company in 1993 initially as an inner-city drama school. Darlinghurst Theatre productions were originally based at the Wayside Theatre in Kings Cross. A devastating hail storm destroyed its roof and the company was sent in search of new home. South Sydney Council assisted by providing a venue with affordable rent.

With financial support from the New South Wales Ministry of the Arts, The Grosvenor Club and numerous individuals, A$500,000 worth of internal renovations was completed and a new Sydney theatre was born in Potts Point. At the time of the renovations, Sydney's Her Majesty's Theatre was closed and some of that theatre's equipment found a new home at Darlinghurst Theatre, including seats, dressing room mirrors, lighting and bar equipment.

From 2016–2018, the theatre partnered with Women in Theatre and Screen (WITS) to present an annual all-female theatre festival called Festival Fatale. It launched in 2016 as part of WITS' larger work advocating for gender representation on stage and includes readings and staged plays.

Productions
 1996: Landscape of the Body by John Guare (directed by Glenn Terry)
 1996: Underwear, Perfume and Crash Helmet by Michael Gurr 
 1996: When You Comin' Back Red Ryder? by Mark Medoff (directed by Chrissy Ynfante) 
 1997: The Ugly Man by Brad Fraser (directed by Michael Darragh) 
 1998: Frozen (directed by Chrissy Ynfante) 
 1999: The Next Big Thing (directed by Matthew John Stewart) 
 2001: The Woolgatherer by William Mastosimone 
 2005: Terminus by Daniel Keane 
 2005: Onna No Honour 
 2005: The Young Tycoons by Christopher Johnson 
 2006: Blue Eyes and Heels by Toby Whithouse 
 2007: The Bee by Hideki Noda and Colin Teevan (directed by Sarah Enright) 
 2009: The Kursk by Sasha Janowicz (directed by Michael Futcher) 
 2011: 10,000 beers by Alex Broun (directed by Lee Lewis) 
 2012: Ordinary Days by Adam Gwon (directed by Grace Barnes) in conjunction with Squabbalogic

References

External links
  Darlinghurst Theatre's website

Theatre in Sydney
Theatre companies in Australia